Sir Desmond Henry Pitcher  (born 23 March 1935) is a British businessman and former Deputy Chairman of Everton Football Club. He was knighted in 1992 for his services to Merseyside.

References

External links
Profile at debretts.co.uk

Everton F.C. directors and chairmen
1935 births
Knights Bachelor
Businesspeople from Liverpool
Living people